Angiopolybia is a genus from the tribe Epiponini. The species was originally described by R L Araujo in 1946.

Description 
Angiopolybia is a Neotropical swarming-founding social wasp. The nests of Angiopolybia are ovoid or bottle-shaped, with a single entry at the lower part.

Taxonomy 
The genus is composed of four species:

 Angiopolybia pallens
 Angiopolybia paraensis
 Angiopolybia obidensis
 Angiopolybia zischkai

Range 
Angiopolybia has been observed from Costa Rica to the south-central region of Brazil, with the exception of Angiopolybia pallens, which only occurs in the northern Atlantic coast of the Amazon.

References

Hymenoptera genera
Hymenoptera of South America
Vespidae